The 2012–13 SIU Edwardsville Cougars men's basketball team represented Southern Illinois University Edwardsville during the 2012–13 NCAA Division I men's basketball season. The Cougars, led by sixth-year head coach Lennox Forrester, played their home games at the Vadalabene Center and were members of the West Division of the Ohio Valley Conference.

Preseason
Ten players returned from the 10–17 team of 2011–12, and two transfers were newly eligible.

The OVC's pre-season coaches' poll picked SIUE to finish fourth in the West Division.   Senior Mark Yelovich was selected to the pre-season All-OVC team.

Season
During the season, crucial team members Reggie Reed, Maurice Wiltz, and Mark Yelovich suffered injuries, and late in the season, leading scorer Jerome Jones was suspended for the duration.  As a result, the Cougars foundered, ending the season 9–18 and 5–11 in OVC play to finish in a tie for fourth place in the West Division. They failed to qualify for the Ohio Valley Conference tournament.

Roster

† Sat out 2012–13 season due to NCAA Division I transfer rules

Schedule
Source = 

|-
!colspan=9 style="background:#CC0000; color:black;"| Exhibition

|-
!colspan=9  style="background:#CC0000; color:black;"|Regular Season

References 

SIU Edwardsville
SIU Edwardsville Cougars men's basketball seasons
SIU Edwardsville Cougars men's basketball
SIU Edwardsville Cougars men's basketball